William C. Rank (June 8, 1904 – May 20, 1979) was an American jazz trombonist.

Rank was born in Lafayette, Indiana, United States, and initially worked in Indiana and Florida. In 1922, Rank played trombone in Tade's Singing Orchestra, which was led by violinist, Tade Dolen.  Between 1923 and 1927 he played with Jean Goldkette's band in Detroit and often recorded with Bix Beiderbecke. After playing with Adrian Rollini in 1927 and a period as a freelance, Rank joined Paul Whiteman's band, and stayed until 1938. He was then a studio musician in Hollywood into the early 1940s, when he moved to Cincinnati. There, he led a tenet for the rest of the 1940s.

Rank then changed to playing part-time while also working in insurance. His one album as a leader, a tribute to Beiderbecke, was recorded in 1973. Rank continued playing until a short time before his death, on May 20, 1979, in Cincinnati.

Discography

As leader
Bix's Gang Lives (Fat Cat's Jazz)

As sideman
With Bix Beiderbecke
At the Jazz Band Ball (Okeh Records)
Goose Pimples (Okeh Records)
Jazz Me Blues (Okeh Records)
Louisiana (Okeh Records)
Margie (Okeh Records)
Ol' Man River (Okeh Records)
Rhythm King (Okeh Records)
Royal Garden Blues (Okeh Records)
Since My Best Gal Turned Me Down (Okeh Records)
Somebody Stole My Gal (Okeh Records)
Sorry (Okeh Records)
Thou Swell (Okeh Records)
Wa-Da-Da (Everybody's Doin' It Now) (Okeh Records)

References

1904 births
1979 deaths
American jazz trombonists
Male trombonists
20th-century American musicians
20th-century trombonists
20th-century American male musicians
American male jazz musicians
Victor Recording Orchestra members